Fred Klein (8 April 1898 – 25 April 1990) was a Dutch painter who spent much of his life in France.  Born Friedrich Franz Albert Klein in Bandung, Indonesia, he was known in the Netherlands under the name of Frits Klein and in France as Fred Klein.

He lived and worked in France beginning in 1920. His style was somewhat akin to Impressionism. A figurative painter of landscapes, he had exhibitions starting in 1930. He is known for his frequent depiction of horses and dreamy beach scenes. Dutch critics admired his work as did French ones, who often compared him to Odilon Redon. "[Klein] starts from a dream of colors from which the motif gradually takes shape. Notwithstanding he still reverts to reality with this, albeit a dreamed up reality," one review concluded.

Klein's work was included in the 1939 exhibition and sale Onze Kunst van Heden (Our Art of Today) at the Rijksmuseum in Amsterdam.

On his 80th birthday, the Van Gogh Museum in Amsterdam held a retrospective of his work. In recent years, there has been renewed interest in his paintings, leading to a spike in prices.

Klein and his first wife, painter Marie Raymond, were the parents of celebrated painter Yves Klein. His second wife was the painter Ursula Bardsley.

References

 
"Almost Forgotten," article in Tableau Fine Arts magazine by Willemijn Gertsen
file:///G:/IMPRIMIR/Fuentes/Trabajo%20Yves%20Klein/4.%20Marie__RaymondYves__Klein.__Herencias_(3647).pdf
Based on a translation of the entry for Fred Klein in the French Wikipedia

External links
Site devoted to Fred Klein (with text available in English, French and Dutch)
 Biography of Klein on Dutch gallery website
Article in Dutch and English on Klein, the "almost forgotten" artist
 Beach paintings by Klein
 2001 auction of Klein "Horses" painting
[Index-https://harn.dse.nl/fritsklein/index.htm/ Dutch site devoted to Fred Klein]

1898 births
1990 deaths
People from Bandung
Dutch painters
Dutch male painters
20th-century French painters
20th-century French male artists
French male painters
Yves Klein